Counihan is a surname. Notable people with the surname include:

Conor Counihan (born 1959), Irish Gaelic footballer
John Counihan (1879–1953), Irish politician
Kevin Counihan, American health care executive
Noel Counihan (1913–1986), Australian painter, printmaker, cartoonist and illustrator 
Shaun Counihan, (born 1979), a South African most famous for his uncanny resemblance to Richard Dean Anderson in the TV hit series Macgyver(1985)